Richard M. Murray is a synthetic biologist and Thomas E. and Doris Everhart Professor of Control & Dynamical Systems and Bioengineering at Caltech, California.

Research 
Murray is a pioneer of the field of biological engineering, synthetic biology and control theory.
His research focuses on the application of feedback and control to networked systems, biomolecular feedback systems, novel architectures for control systems, and networked control systems.

Murray is a founder and steering group member of the Build-a-Cell Initiative, an international collaboration investigating creation of synthetic live cells.

Awards and honors
Murray was elected a member of the National Academy of Engineering in 2013 for contributions in control theory and networked control systems with applications to aerospace engineering, robotics, and autonomy.

References

External links 
 Lab webpage
 Control Theory and Methods - Richard Murray KISSCaltech lecture
 History of robotics interview

Living people
Synthetic biologists
American bioengineers
California Institute of Technology faculty
Year of birth missing (living people)